The 1969 Maine Black Bears football team was an American football team that represented the University of Maine as a member of the Yankee Conference during the 1969 NCAA College Division football season. In its third season under head coach Walter Abbott, the team compiled a 5–4 record (3–2 against conference opponents) and tied for second out of six teams in the Yankee Conference. Paul Dulac was the team captain.

Schedule

References

Maine
Maine Black Bears football seasons
Maine Black Bears football